Mauricio Doria-Medina (born 22 September 1988) is a Bolivian former professional tennis player.

A left-handed player from Cochabamba, Doria-Medina was a silver medalist for Bolivia at the 2006 South American Games in Buenos Aires, as the runner-up in the singles tournament, to Brazil's Nicolas Santos. He also represented Bolivia at the 2007 and 2011 editions of the Pan American Games.

Doria-Medina, who won 12 ITF Futures titles, competed in 20 Davis Cup ties for Bolivia between 2007 and 2012.

References

External links
 
 
 

1988 births
Living people
Bolivian male tennis players
South American Games silver medalists for Bolivia
South American Games medalists in tennis
Competitors at the 2006 South American Games
Tennis players at the 2007 Pan American Games
Tennis players at the 2011 Pan American Games
Pan American Games competitors for Bolivia
Sportspeople from Cochabamba